The County of Rawbelle is a county (a cadastral division) in Queensland, Australia, located in the Wide Bay–Burnett region. On 7 March 1901, the Governor issued a proclamation legally dividing Queensland into counties under the Land Act 1897. Its schedule described Rawbelle thus:

Parishes
Rawbelle is divided into parishes, as listed below:

References

Rawbelle

External links